Dame Elizabeth Gloster, DBE, PC (born 5 June 1949) is a British lawyer who was a judge of the Court of Appeal of England and Wales and Vice-President of the Civil Division. She was the first female judge of the Commercial Court.

Education
Gloster was educated at Roedean School and Girton College, Cambridge.

Career
Gloster was called to the bar by the Inner Temple in 1971 (and made a bencher in 1992). In 1989, she became a Queen's Counsel. She was appointed a judge of the Courts of Appeal of Jersey and Guernsey in 1993 and a Recorder in 1995.

On 21 April 2004, Gloster was appointed a High Court judge, receiving the customary appointment as a Dame Commander of the Order of the British Empire (DBE) and allocated to the Queen's Bench Division (Commercial Court). From 2010 to 2012, she was the judge in charge of the Commercial Court.

Gloster heard a case in 2012 involving two Russian oligarchs in which Boris Berezovsky claimed Roman Abramovich had intimidated him into selling shares in Russian oil giant Sibneft. and was claiming £3bn in damages. She found Berezovsky to be "an inherently unreliable witness" and found in favour of Abramovich. An editorial in The Times agreed with the judge's conclusion. At the start of the trial she had disclosed in court that her stepson had represented Abramovich as a barrister at an early stage of the case. Berezovsky's lawyers said their client had no objection to her continuing to hear the case. They later claimed that the barrister's involvement for which he had been paid £469,000 in fees had been understated but did not appeal against the judgment.  Asked outside the court if he felt Russia's President Vladimir Putin would be happy with the ruling, Berezovsky replied: "Sometimes I have the impression that Putin himself wrote this judgment." A Statement from the Judicial Office which represents judges said Dame Elizabeth's stepson had not appeared at any hearings where she had been present. The statement said: "Where a judge has disclosed a family relationship to the parties, it is a judicial decision whether a judge believes he or she should recuse him or herself. The way to challenge a decision not to recuse would be by appealing through the courts."

On 9 April 2013, Dame Elizabeth was appointed a Lady Justice of Appeal and consequently appointed to the Privy Council.

She became Vice-President of the Civil Division of the Court of Appeal on 7 December 2016, on the retirement of Lord Justice Moore-Bick. She retired from the Court of Appeal on 1 June 2018.

Judgments
Relfo Ltd v Varsani [2014] EWCA Civ 360 -  English unjust enrichment law concerning to what extent enrichment of the defendant must be at the expense of the claimant; Gloster LJ concurring with Arden LJ

Private life 
In 2005, Elizabeth Gloster was divorced from Stanley Brodie QC. On 15 March 2008, she married Sir Oliver Popplewell.

References

1949 births
Living people
Alumni of Girton College, Cambridge
English barristers
English women judges
Dames Commander of the Order of the British Empire
Fellows of Girton College, Cambridge
Judiciary of Jersey
Lady Justices of Appeal
Members of the Inner Temple
People educated at Roedean School, East Sussex
Queen's Bench Division judges
Members of the Privy Council of the United Kingdom